The 1959 Canada Cup took place 18–21 November at the Royal Melbourne Golf Club in Melbourne, Australia. It was the seventh Canada Cup event, which became the World Cup in 1967. The tournament was a 72-hole stroke play team event with 30 teams. These were the same teams that had competed in 1958 but without Ecuador, Peru and Venezuela and with the addition of Indonesia. Each team consisted of two players from a country. The combined score of each team determined the team results. The Australian team of Kel Nagle and Peter Thomson won by 10 strokes over the American team of Cary Middlecoff and Sam Snead. The individual competition was won by Canadian Stan Leonard, who beat Peter Thomson at the first hole of a sudden-death playoff.

Teams

Source

Scores
Team

Source

International Trophy

Leonard beat Thomson with a par 4 at the first hole of a sudden-death playoff.

Source

References

World Cup (men's golf)
Golf tournaments in Australia
Canada Cup
Canada Cup
Canada Cup